The 1924 Volta a Catalunya was the sixth edition of the Volta a Catalunya cycle race and was held from 29 May to 1 June 1924. The race started and finished in Barcelona.

Route and stages

General classification

References

1924
Volta
1924 in Spanish road cycling
June 1924 sports events